Xinhua is a town of Linze County in west-central Gansu province, China, located  northwest of Zhangye and serviced by China National Highway 312; G30 Lianyungang–Khorgas Expressway passes just to the town's south. , it has 11 villages under its administration.

See also
List of township-level divisions of Gansu

References

Township-level divisions of Gansu